On 22 April 2019, Chairman of Uly Dala Qyrandary Sadibek Tügel nominated himself as candidate for the presidential elections, making him one of the first participants to do it. He became registered candidate on 3 May 2019 after gathering more than 120,000 signatures from 15 regions in Kazakhstan. On 11 May, he published his election platform on his website.

Policies 

 Improving the country’s demographics
 Supporting the return of Kazakh diaspora
 Strengthening Kazakh language
 Modernizing and developing the Alash ideals
 Ending corruption
 Solving unemployment issue
 Nationalization of natural resources
 Introducing a Bey Council
 Implementation of a new Kazakh Constitution

Economic policy 
Tügel's campaign stated that “all natural resources of the Kazakh land are considered the property of our people. Therefore, the assets in the hands of foreigners must be nationalized, the funds withdrawn abroad must be returned." He also called for each citizen to be provided an additional annual income.

Campaign 
Tügel's campaign was built on conservatism, where he called on the nation to preserve its national values and traditions and reject any western influence. To demonstrate it, he visited Kenesary Khan's cave in the Burabay National Park where he mentioned that "Kenesary Khan is not only the last of the khans in the history of the Kazakhs, but also an outstanding personality who took a place in the heart of his people thanks to persistence and high spirit." Tügel called for closure of night clubs, saying that Kazakhstan needs a "highly moral and active generation" by suggesting to create a "morality police". He also proposed in Kazakhstani citizens being banned from marrying foreigners to which he called it a threat to "Kazakh gene pool" and oblige citizens to create families before reaching the age of 25 as a way raising the demography in the country.

On 21 May 2019, Tügel met with Representatives of the scientific community, journalists, invited guests. From there, he gave his campaign speech saying "our duty is to pass on to the younger generation the enduring spiritual values, national traditions and customs that come from our ancestors, to preserve peace and stability in the country. How we educate young people today, this will be the fate of our country."

References 

2019 Kazakh presidential election
2019 Kazakh presidential campaigns
Tügel